Lieber is a surname. Notable people with the surname include:

 Clara Lieber (1902–1982), an American chemist
 Charles M. Lieber (born 1959), professor of chemistry at Harvard University
 Ernst Maria Lieber (1838–1902), German politician
 Francis Lieber (1800–1872), jurist, author of the Lieber Code
 Jeffrey Lieber, screenwriter
 Jon Lieber (born 1970), baseball player
 Larry Lieber (born 1931), comic book writer
 Lillian Rosanoff Lieber (1886–1986), mathematician and author
 Maxim Lieber (1897–1993), American literary agent and communist spy in the 1930s
 Michael Lieber, British actor
 Moriz Lieber (1790–1860), German politician and publisher
 Richard Lieber (1869–1944), conservationist
 Rochelle Lieber, linguist
 Stan Lee (born Stanley Lieber) (1922–2018), comic book writer

See also 
 Leiber
 Jerry Leiber and Mike Stoller, American record producers and songwriters

German-language surnames
Jewish surnames
Yiddish-language surnames